Anil Kalajerao Babar (born 7 January 1950 ) is an Indian politician serving as Member of the Maharashtra Legislative Assembly from  Khanapur Vidhan Sabha constituency as a member of Shiv Sena.

Early life
Anil Babar (popularly known as Anilrao Babar) was born in a farmer family, at a village Gardi, Taluka Khanapur. Entering politics at early age, he was elected as a Sarpanch of village Gardi, Taluka Khanapur, at the age of 19. He speaks Marathi, Hindi and English.

Political career

References

External links
  Shivsena Home Page 

1950 births
Living people
Maharashtra MLAs 1990–1995
Maharashtra MLAs 1999–2004
Marathi politicians
Shiv Sena politicians